Cheimerius nufar, also known as the Santer seabream, is a species in the family Sparidae and is found in the Indian Ocean, from the Red Sea, down to the southern Cape coast in South Africa and as far east as India and Sri Lanka. This species is the only known member of the genus Cheimerius.<ref name=Tanaka2015>{{cite journal | last1 = Tanaka | first1 = F. | last2 = Iwatsuki | first2 = Y. | year = 2015 | title = Amamiichthys, a new genus for the sparid fish Cheimerius matsubarai Akazaki 1962, and redescription of the species, with designation of a neotype | journal = Zootaxa | volume = 4007 | issue = 2| pages = 195–206 | doi = 10.11646/zootaxa.4007.2.3 | pmid = 26623801 }}</ref> Unlike other members of the sparid family, C. nufar'' is gonochoric (does not change sex after birth).

References

Sparidae
Monotypic ray-finned fish genera
Monotypic marine fish genera
Fish described in 1930
Taxa named by J. L. B. Smith